The Yorkshire Dales National Park is a  national park in England covering most of the Yorkshire Dales. Most of the park is in North Yorkshire, with a sizeable area in Westmorland (Cumbria) and a small part in Lancashire. The park was designated in 1954, and extended in 2016. Over 95% of the land in the Park is under private ownership; there are over 1,000 farms in this area.

In late 2020, the park was named as an International Dark Sky Reserve. This honour confirms that the area has "low levels of light pollution with good conditions for astronomy".

Some 23,500 residents live in the park (as of 2017); a 2018 report estimated that the Park attracted over four million visitors per year. The economy consists primarily of tourism and agriculture.

Location

The national park does not include all of the Yorkshire Dales. Parts of the dales to the south and east of the national park are located in the Nidderdale Area of Outstanding Natural Beauty. The national park also includes the Howgill Fells and Orton Fells in the north west although they are not often considered part of the dales.

History
In 1947, the Hobhouse Report recommended the creation of the Yorkshire Dales National Park in the then West Riding and North Riding of Yorkshire.  The proposed National Park included most of the Yorkshire Dales, but not Nidderdale. Accordingly, Nidderdale was not included in the National Park when it was designated in 1954.  In 1963 the then West Riding County Council proposed that Nidderdale should be added to the National Park, but the proposal met with opposition from the district councils which would have lost some of their powers to the county council.

Following the Local Government Act 1972 most of the area of the national park was transferred in 1974 to the new county of North Yorkshire.  An area in the north west of the national park (Dentdale, Garsdale and the town of Sedbergh) was transferred from the West Riding of Yorkshire to the new county of Cumbria.  In 1997 management of the national park passed from the county councils to the Yorkshire Dales National Park Authority.

2016 extension

A westward extension of the park into Lancashire and Cumbria encompassed much of the area between the old boundaries of the park and the M6 motorway. This increased the area by nearly 24% and brought the park close to the towns of Kirkby Lonsdale, Kirkby Stephen and Appleby-in-Westmorland. The extension also includes the northern portion of the Howgill Fells and most of the Orton Fells. Before the expansion, the national park was solely in the historic county of Yorkshire, the expansion bringing in parts of historic Lancashire and Westmorland.

Tourism

The area has a wide range of activities for visitors. For example, many people come to the Dales for walking or other exercise. Several long-distance routes cross the park, including the Pennine Way, the Dales Way, the Coast to Coast Walk and the Pennine Bridleway. Cycling is also popular and there are several cycleways.

The DalesBus service provides service in the Dales on certain days in summer, "including the Yorkshire Dales National Park and Nidderdale Area of Outstanding Natural Beauty". In summer, these buses supplement the other services that operate year-round in the Dales.

Tourism in the region declined due to restrictions necessitated by the COVID-19 pandemic in 2020, and into 2021. Later in 2021, the volume of visits was expected to increase as a result of the 2020 TV series All Creatures Great and Small, largely filmed within the Dales. The first series aired in the UK in September 2020 and in the US in early 2021. One source stated that visits to Yorkshire Web sites had increased significantly by late September 2020. By early 2021, the Discover England Web sites, for example, were using the tag line "Discover All Creatures Great and Small in Yorkshire".

The Dales Countryside Museum is housed in the converted Hawes railway station in Wensleydale in the north of the area. The park also has five visitor centres. These are at:

 Aysgarth Falls
 Grassington
 Hawes
 Malham
 Reeth

Other places and sights within the National Park include:

 Bolton Castle
 Clapham
 Cautley Spout waterfall
 Firbank Fell
 Gaping Gill
 Gayle Mill
 Hardraw Force
 Horton in Ribblesdale
 Howgill Fells 
 Kisdon Force (waterfall) in Swaledale
 Leck Fell
 Malham Cove, Gordale Scar, Janet's Foss and Malham Tarn
 Orton Fells
 River Lune
 Sedbergh
 Settle
 Settle and Carlisle Railway including the Ribblehead Viaduct
 Wild Boar Fell
 The Yorkshire Three Peaks (Ingleborough, Pen-y-ghent and Whernside)

References

External links
 Yorkshire Dales National Park Authority

National parks in England
Protected areas established in 1954
Yorkshire Dales
Protected areas of North Yorkshire
Geography of Yorkshire